Jay Gerard Bradley (born August 6, 1998), known professionally as Almighty Jay (formerly YBN Almighty Jay), is an American rapper. He was part of the YBN collective before their disbandment in August 2020. He is best known for singles such as "Chopsticks", "Bread Winners", and "No Hook".

Career 
Bradley started gaining traction after he released the singles "Chopsticks" and "No Hook", the latter of which featured fellow rapper and friend YBN Nahmir. Both tracks earned millions of views on YouTube.

Personal life 
Bradley started dating model Blac Chyna in February 2018, but they split in June.

Bradley dated rapper DreamDoll from March to August 2019.

Assault in New York City 
In March 2019, Bradley was attacked in New York City, where his money and chains were taken. He was also stomped on and stabbed several times. He reportedly received over 300 stitches after the incident, and addressed the attack on his track "Let Me Breathe".

Discography

Mixtapes

EPs

Singles

References 

1998 births
Living people
Rappers from Texas
African-American male rappers
Atlantic Records artists
21st-century American rappers
21st-century American male musicians
Twitch (service) streamers
21st-century African-American musicians
People from Galveston, Texas
Southern hip hop musicians
Trap musicians